"Let Me Be Free" is a song by Dutch Eurodance group 2 Brothers on the 4th Floor featuring rapper D-Rock and singer Des'Ray. It was released in 1994 as the fifth and last single from their debut album, Dreams (1994). The single achieved moderate success, reaching number three in Israel, number five in Italy, number six in the Netherlands, number eleven in Belgium and number twelve in Denmark. On the Eurochart Hot 100, it peaked at number 42 in December 1994.

Track listing
 12", Netherlands (1994)
"Let Me Be Free" (Extended Version) – 5:17
"Let Me Be Free" (Music For Lovers Remix) – 5:47
"Let Me Be Free" (Beats 'R' Us Remix) – 6:04
"Let Me Be Free" (Lick Remix) – 5:45
"Let Me Be Free" (Dancability Club Remix) – 4:52

 CD single, Europe (1994)
"Let Me Be Free" (Radio Version) – 3:25
"Let Me Be Free" (Beat 'R' Us Radio Mix) – 4:39

 CD maxi, Scandinavia (1994)
"Let Me Be Free" (Radio Version) – 3:25
"Let Me Be Free" (Beats 'R' Us Radio Mix) – 4:39
"Let Me Be Free" (Extended Version) – 5:17
"Let Me Be Free" (Beats 'R' Us Mix) – 6:04
"Let Me Be Free" (Music For Lovers Mix) – 5:47
"Let Me Be Free" (Lick Mix) – 5:45
"Let Me Be Free" (Dancability Club Mix) – 4:52
"Let Me Be Free" (Album Version) – 3:26

Charts

Weekly charts

Year-end charts

References

 

1994 singles
1994 songs
2 Brothers on the 4th Floor songs
English-language Dutch songs
ZYX Music singles